Hossein Saveh Shemshaki (born August 5, 1985 in Tehran) is an alpine skier from Iran.  He, along with his brother, Pouria Saveh-Shemshaki, competed for Iran at the 2010 Winter Olympics.  His best result in the Winter Olympic Games is 41st place in the slalom.

He was chosen as Iran's Flag Bearer for the 2014 Sochi Winter Olympics and 2017 Sapporo Asian Winter Games.

One of the best performances of Saveh Shemshaki in international competitions was winning a gold medal in the Slalom and a silver medal in the Giant Slalom at the 2015 Asian Alpine Ski Championships.

In February 2022, Saveh Shemshaki became the first athlete to provide a positive test for doping at the 2022 Winter Olympics. and subsequently suspended from competing, training, coaching or participating in any activity during the Olympic Winter Games Beijing 2022 per the ITA.

Winter Olympics and Asian Cups results

References

External links
 Saveh Shemshaki on Instagram
 

1985 births
Living people
Iranian male alpine skiers
Olympic alpine skiers of Iran
Alpine skiers at the 2010 Winter Olympics
Alpine skiers at the 2014 Winter Olympics
Alpine skiers at the 2007 Asian Winter Games
Alpine skiers at the 2011 Asian Winter Games
Alpine skiers at the 2017 Asian Winter Games
Iranian sportspeople in doping cases
Doping cases in alpine skiing